Yukarıkuyucak can refer to:

 Yukarıkuyucak, Kastamonu
 Yukarıkuyucak, Ortaköy